Catya Maré (pronunciation: catya maree) is a multiple award-winning composer, music producer, classical crossover violinist, visual artist and writer from Germany, now located in California. She received her US green card based on her achievements in the musical field. Maré has performed as a classical violinist since her early childhood, and has done numerous performances at concert halls and major museums, such as National Gallery Berlin, Kunsthaus Zürich, Kunsthallen Brandts, and Kunstmuseet Trapholt. In 2006, she started to compose and produce her own music (Electronic / Pop / World / Celtic new age / Classical crossover). Maré was nominated for the Hollywood Music Award in November 2008 and won the Billboard World Songwriting Contest in February 2009. 
In November 2009, she won the Hollywood Music in Media Award and in December 2010 the USA Songwriting Competition.
October, 2010 she received a US Green Card based on her achievements.
In August 2011, Maré´s music video "Tell Me Why..." was nominated for the Stay Tuned TV Award / International Television Festival.
In 2012, 2013, and 2014, she received additional nominations for the prestigious Hollywood Music in Media Award.

At this time, Maré is best known for her multiple award-winning new age / classical crossover music compositions; however, she simultaneously has been active as a visual artist and writer her entire life.

In September, 2013, she released two poetry books, "A Silvery Moment" and "White Marbles". Complex, haiku style contemplations.

August 28, 2014, Maré released one more instrumental pop / new age / classical crossover music production, titled "Voce". This single was composed, produced and performed by Maré, and audio mastered by Matt Forger at Anisound, whose credits include Michael Jackson, Donna Summer, Paul McCartney, Patti Austin, Missing Persons, Michael McDonald, James Ingram, Siedah Garrett, Quincy Jones, Steven Spielberg, John Landis and George Lucas.

Life and career 
Catya Maré was born in Neuss, Germany, into a family of professional classical musicians. She performed her first concert as a soloist with a symphony orchestra being only 10 years old. While a young adult she played solo concerts as a classical violinist in the United States, Israel, Scandinavia, Europe and at many festivals including Schleswig-Holstein Musikfestival and Santander Music Festival. Maré has received numerous scholarships (such as Stipendium der Münchner Orchesterakademie, Stipendium der Rotarischen Gesellschaft Hamburg and Konzerte Junger Künstler). She has received her master's degree at the Munich Music Conservatory and held the position of an alternating concertmaster with the Scandinavian symphony orchestra Aarhus Symfoniorkester.

In 2005, she became aware of her capability to improvise on her violin. During the following year, she did numerous solo violin improv performances at prestigious cultural institutions, such as the National Gallery, Berlin (Germany) and Kunsthaus Zürich (Switzerland).
She left the orchestra in 2006 to create / perform her own music (Electronic / Pop / World / Celtic new age / Classical crossover), using her violin as the primary voice.

In 2008, Maré relocated to the United States.  
She released five CDs, Light Longing, which was the result of a collaboration with the Danish music producers Jakob Gadegaard and Henrik Koitzsch, Remembering The Day, Destination Love, Tell Me Why... and Talk Talk Talk, which she composed, recorded and produced herself.

Her music is featured e.g. on motion pictures Butterflies In The Wind, which premiered at the 2007 Ava Gardner Film Festival in North Carolina, the short film "Homecoming" and TV series, such as "Cruisin´With eRider".

In November 2008, her instrumental song "It Came True" was nominated for the Hollywood Music Award in the category "classical / orchestral" and Maré's song "Light Longing" won the Billboard World Songwriting Contest in February 2009 in the category "electronica / soundtracks".

November 2009, Maré won the Hollywood Music In Media Award (HMMA) 2009.

May 2010, The Recording Academy officially appointed Maré Voting Member for the Grammys 2011.

In June, 2010, Maré started to include her voice into her musical work, what resulted in a new style (electronic / pop / world).
Her new albums, featuring this humorous new musical style, "Tell Me Why..." and "Talk Talk Talk" were released worldwide in fall 2010.

October, 2010, she received her US Green Card based on her achievements.

December, 2010, Maré won the USA Songwriting Competition (Best Instrumental Song).
In August, 2011 Maré´s music video "Tell Me Why..." was nominated for the Stay Tuned TV Award / International Television Festival.
2012, 2013 and 2014 she received additional nominations for the prestigious Hollywood Music in Media Award .

August 28, 2014, Maré released one more instrumental pop / classical crossover / new age music production, titled "Voce". 
Credits: composition, production, solo violin performance, mixing, arranging, orchestration and artwork design by Maré, audio mastering by Matt Forger at Anisound.

Discography 

Light Longing
Release date: 2007
Label: Self-Released
UPC: 0786851564662

Remembering The Day
Release date: 2008
Label: Self-Released
UPC: 0786851564860

Destination Love
Release date: February 8, 2010
Label: Self-Released
UPC: 0786851590661

Tell Me Why...
Release date: September 8, 2010
Label: Self-Released
UPC: 0786851109375

Talk Talk Talk
Release date: November 15, 2010
Label: Self-Released
UPC: 0786851316872

Voce
Release date: August 28, 2014
Label: Self-Released
UPC: ushm81449478

Book releases 

A Silvery Moment
Release date: September 5, 2013
Label: Self-Released
UPC: ASIN: B00EZEXH1G

White Marbles"
Release date: September 21, 2013
Label: Self-Released
UPC: ASIN: B00FC22QGW

See also 
List of ambient music artists

References

External links 
Catya Maré‘s website, including reviews, music samples and bio
Catya Maré pictures (red carpet appearances, award shows, acting and modeling, works of art)

Year of birth missing (living people)
Living people
German violinists
German composers
German record producers
German women poets
German women artists
German women record producers
21st-century violinists
21st-century women musicians